Kohlbach is a river of Bavaria, Germany. It is a left tributary of the Ammer south of Oberammergau.

See also
List of rivers of Bavaria

Rivers of Bavaria
Rivers of Germany